The Luohu Port is a port of entry/border crossing between mainland China and Hong Kong, located in Luohu District of Shenzhen and Lo Wu, New Territories of Hong Kong. It sits within the Frontier Closed Area. The control point is integrated with Lo Wu station of the Mass Transit Railway (MTR) and Luohu station of the Shenzhen metro, the Hong Kong counterpart being Lo Wu Control Point.

According to the Luohu District People's Government, Luohu Port is the busiest land border crossing in the world. However, statistics show that it is the third busiest in the world. The port of entry is operated by the Bureau of Exit and Entry Administration of the Ministry of Public Security, and the General Administration of Customs. In 2015, 83.2 million people passed through Lo Wu Control Point, making it the busiest control point in Hong Kong.

It is served by Shenzhen railway station of the Guangshen Railway (formerly the Canton-Kowloon Railway Chinese Section), and Luohu station of the Shenzhen Metro, whereas its counterpart in Hong Kong is interconnected with Lo Wu station on the East Rail line, formerly the Kowloon-Canton Railway British Section.

Operating hours 
6:30 a.m. to midnight every day.

Gallery

References 

Luohu District
China–Hong Kong border crossings
Closed Area
North District, Hong Kong